SSAHE may refer to:
 Sri Siddhartha Academy of Higher Education, private college in India
 Swiss Society of Anatomy, Histology and Embryology, see Life Sciences Switzerland